Founded on 18 March 2011, the Max Planck Institute for Intelligent Systems (MPI-IS) is one of the 86 research institutes of the Max Planck Society. With locations in Stuttgart and Tübingen, it combines interdisciplinary research in the growing field of intelligent systems. 
Intelligent systems are becoming increasingly important in many areas of life – as virtual systems on the Internet or as cyber-physical systems in the physical world. Artificial intelligent systems can be used in a broad range of areas, for instance in autonomous vehicles or to diagnose and fight diseases.

Research departments 
 Empirical Inference (Bernhard Schölkopf), Tübingen
 Haptic Intelligence (Katherine Kuchenbecker), Stuttgart
 Modern Magnetic Systems (Gisela Schütz), Stuttgart
 Perceiving Systems (Michael J. Black), Tübingen
 Physical Intelligence (Metin Sitti), Stuttgart
 Robotic Materials (Christoph Keplinger), Stuttgart
 Social Foundations of Computation (Moritz Hardt), Tübingen

Current Research Groups 
 Autonomous Learning (Georg Martius), Tübingen
 Dynamic Locomotion (Alexander Badri-Sprowitz), Stuttgart 
 Embodied Vision (Jörg Stückler), Tübingen 
 Human Aspects of Machine Learning (Samira Samadi), Tübingen
 Learning and Dynamical Systems (Michael Mühlebach), Tübingen
 Locomotion in Biorobotic and Somatic Systems (Ardian Jusufi), Stuttgart
 Neural Capture and Synthesis (Justus Thies), Tübingen
 Organizational Leadership and Diversity (Ksenia Keplinger), Stuttgart
 Physics for Inference and Optimization (Caterina De Bacco), Tübingen
 Rationality Enhancement (Falk Lieder), Tübingen
 Robust Machine Learning (Wieland Brendel), Tübingen

Current Max Planck Fellow Groups 

 Coordinative Intelligence (Thomas Hofmann), Tübingen/Zürich
 Human-centric Vision & Learning (Otmar Hilliges), Tübingen/Zürich
 Interactive Learning (Andreas Krause), Tübingen/Zürich
 Magnetic Resonance Imaging (MRI) (Klaas P. Prüssmann), Stuttgart/Zürich

Initiatives and networks 
The Max Planck Institute for Intelligent Systems and ETH Zurich cooperate in the research field of "Learning Systems". For this purpose, they have founded the Max Planck ETH Center for Learning Systems (CLS). It is the first joint doctoral program of ETH Zurich and the Max Planck Society. 
Since the program was founded in 2015, 112 doctoral students and post-docs have been admitted as Fellows or Associated Fellows. CLS currently counts 50 directors, professors, and research group leaders among its members or associated members. In July 2019, the Max Planck Society and ETH Zurich agreed to extend the program's funding until 2025.

Since December 2016, the Max Planck Institute for Intelligent Systems is part of the research network Cyber Valley. Partners are the University of Stuttgart, the University of Tübingen, the Fraunhofer Gesellschaft, the State of Baden-Württemberg and seven industrial partners: Amazon, BMW Group, Daimler AG, IAV GmbH, Porsche AG, Robert Bosch GmbH, and ZF Friedrichshafen AG. Cyber Valley is also supported by the Christian Bürkert Foundation, the Gips-Schüle Foundation, the Vector Foundation, and the Carl Zeiss Foundation. 

Founded in 2018, the European Laboratory for Learning and Intelligent Systems (ELLIS) aims to strengthen Europe's role in global AI research.

References 

Intelligent Systems
Education in Tübingen
Organisations based in Tübingen